Yuenyeung (often transliterated according to the Cantonese language pronunciation yuenyeung, yinyeung, or yinyong; yuanyang in Mandarin) is a drink created by mixing coffee with tea. It originated in Hong Kong, where it remains popular.

The exact method of creating yuenyeung varies by vendor and region, but it generally consists of brewed coffee and black tea with sugar and milk. According to the Hong Kong Leisure and Cultural Services Department, the mixture is three parts coffee and seven parts Hong Kong-style milk tea. It can be served hot or cold. 

It was originally served at dai pai dongs (open air food vendors) and cha chaan tengs (café), but is now available in various types of restaurants.

Etymology 
The name yuenyeung, which refers to mandarin ducks (yuanyang), is a symbol of conjugal love in Chinese culture, as the birds usually appear in pairs and the male and female look very different. This same connotation of a "pair" of two unlike items is used to name this drink.

Origin
A Hong Kong dai pai dong-style restaurant called Lan Fong Yuen (蘭芳園) claims both yuenyeung and silk-stocking milk tea were invented in 1952 by its owner, Mr. Lam. Though its claim for yuenyeung is unverified, its claim for silk-stocking milk tea was on the record in the official minutes of a LegCo meeting plausibility.

Adoption
In summer 2010, Starbucks stores in Hong Kong and Macau promoted a frappuccino version of the drink. It was sold as the "Yuen Yeung Frappuccino Blended Cream".

Children's yuenyeung
There is a caffeine-free variant of yuenyeung, called children's yuenyeung (兒童鴛鴦). It is made using Horlicks and Ovaltine, malted milk drink mixes that are common in cha chaan tengs in Hong Kong.

See also
 Yuenyeung fried rice

References

External links 

Blended tea
Hong Kong cuisine
Hong Kong drinks
Coffee drinks